Karel Píč (Esperanto: Karolo Piĉ, 6 December 1920 in Litomyšl – 15 August 1995 in Litomyšl) was a leading Czech Esperantist, a member of the Academy of Esperanto, a poet and writer of short stories, essays, and novels in Esperanto.

Role in Esperanto literature
Karel Píč was a famous and influential Esperanto author. He introduced and used many neologisms, which was controversial. Aside from neologisms, he was noted for his experimental usage of Esperanto; some commentators go so far as to call his usage "piĉido" and imply it is almost another language.

His best known work, epitomizing his linguistic experimentation
, is the semi-autobiographical novel La Litomiŝla tombejo (The Litomyšl Cemetery) (1981) set in his hometown of Litomyšl. Upon his death, Píč was buried in that cemetery, and his tombstone bears the Czech words “Esperantský spisovatel” (“Esperanto writer”).

The "Concise Encyclopedia of the Original Literature of Esperanto" quotes several influential Esperantists about the importance of La Litomiŝla tombejo. Osmo Buller wrote "it is something truly important in Esperanto literature", and Jorge Camacho claimed it as "probably the highest achievement of [Esperanto's] original literature". Esperanto poet William Auld included the novel on his list of Esperanto classics.

Publications
 Short stories
 Ekkrioj de Georgino (Georgia's Cries)
 Fabeloj el transe (Fables from the Other Side)
 La Davida harpo (David's Harp)
 Aboco (ABC)
 Angoro (Anguish)
 Novels
 La Litomiŝla tombejo (The Litomyšl Cemetery)
 Ordeno de verkistoj (The Order of Writers - published posthumously in 1997)
 Mistero de tri unuoj (The Mystery of Three Ones)
 La Bermuda triangulo (The Bermuda Triangle)
Klaĉejo (Nest of Gossip)
 Articles
 La granda superstiĉo (The Grand Superstition)
 Essays
Kritiko kaj recenzistiko en Esperanto (Criticism and the Art of Reviewing in Esperanto)
La interna vivo de Esperanto (The Inner Life of Esperanto)
Esperantaj neologismoj (Esperanto Neologisms, Esperantista 1949, pp. 57, 65)

References

External links
Works of Karel Píč in the Austrian National Library in Vienna
Works of Karel Píč in the German National Library in Leipzig
Karel Píč in a website on Esperanto writers
Website about Karel Píč

Writers of Esperanto literature
Akademio de Esperanto members
Translators to Esperanto
Czech Esperantists
20th-century Czech poets
20th-century male writers
Czech male poets
1920 births
1995 deaths
20th-century translators
20th-century poets